Moose River, Nova Scotia may refer to the following places in Nova Scotia, Canada:

* Moose River, Pictou, Nova Scotia in Pictou County
 Moose River, Cumberland, Nova Scotia in Cumberland County
 Moose River Gold Mines, Nova Scotia in the Halifax Regional Municipality